Ján Kobezda (31 July 1975 – 27 January 2017) was a Slovak professional ice hockey player who played with HC Slovan Bratislava in the Slovak Extraliga.

Kobezda died following a heart attack before the match against HC Košice on 27 January 2017. He was 41.

References

1975 births
People from Ilava
Sportspeople from the Trenčín Region
2017 deaths
Fort Wayne Komets players
HC Slovan Bratislava players
HC Vítkovice players
HK Dubnica players
HK Dukla Trenčín players
Ilves players
Missouri River Otters players
Slovak ice hockey defencemen
Tallahassee Tiger Sharks players
Slovak expatriate ice hockey players in the Czech Republic
Slovak expatriate ice hockey players in the United States
Slovak expatriate ice hockey players in Finland
Expatriate ice hockey players in Iceland
Slovak expatriate sportspeople in Iceland